Partners is a 1932 American Western film directed by Fred Allen, from a screenplay by Donald W. Lee.  The film stars Tom Keene, with Nancy Drexel and Bobby Nelson in supporting roles. It made a profit of $30,000.

Plot
Dick Barstow owns a horse ranch. When he comes upon a traveling salesman, Carry-All Roach, and his grandson, Bud, being harassed by Chet Jarvis, he intervenes, breaking up the incident. He invites the salesman to his ranch to recover. Dick is visited by Mr. Morgan, his daughter, Jean and Jarvis. Both Dick and Jarvis are attracted to Jean. Jarvis purchases a gift for Jean and sees the large amount of cash Roach has. Roach loans Dick $1,500 after he learns Dick owes Mr. Morgan. The next day, returning to his ranch after paying off Mr. Morgan, Dick finds Roach dead by the side of the road, and Bud injured. Dick reports the murder to the local sheriff, and breaks the news of Roach's death to Bud, promising to take care of him. The sheriff suspects Dick of Roach's murder based on circumstantial proof. Dick evades arrest in order to prove his innocence. Jarvis is appointed Bud's guardian as a means to access the rest of Roach's money. Jarvis lies in wait for Dick to return to his ranch where Jean is caring for Bud. Dick convinces Jean he didn't murder Roach despite his evading arrest. Dick escapes as the sheriff and Jarvis breach his house. He returns to the site of the murder, where he finds a distinctive piece of a boot, which matches the brand worn by Jarvis. Dick breaks into Jarvis' motel room where he finds Roach's empty wallet. 

Roach's estate is auctioned off at Dick's ranch with Jarvis acting as administrator. Dick rides back to his ranch, to implicate Jarvis with his proof. When confronted with the empty wallet, it is further discovered that Jarvis has a military medal of Roach's which he used to carry in his wallet. Revealed as the murderer, Jarvis attempts to flee, but is captured by Dick. Returning to his ranch, Dick cements his relationship with Jean and reaffirms his intention to rear Bud.

Cast
 Tom Keene as Dick Barstow
 Nancy Drexel as Jean Morgan
 Otis Harlan as the Auctioneer
 Victor Potel as Deputy Lem
 Bobby Nelson as Bud Roach
 Lee Shumway as Chet Jarvis
 Billy Franey as Carry-All Roach
 Carlton S. King as Mr. Morgan
 Ben Corbett as Shorty
 Fred Burns as the Sheriff
(cast list as per AFI database)

References

External links
Partners at IMDb

1932 Western (genre) films
1932 films
American Western (genre) films
American black-and-white films
Films scored by Arthur Lange
Films directed by Fred Allen (film editor)
1930s American films
1930s English-language films